Timothy Thomas Berra (born September 23, 1951) is a former American football player who played for the Baltimore Colts in 1974. He is the son of Baseball Hall of Fame catcher Yogi Berra and the brother of former Major League Baseball (MLB) infielder Dale Berra.

College
Berra played college football for the UMass Minutemen from 1970 to 1973. During his senior season, he set the school's single-season record for receiving yards with 922 and the single-season touchdown receiving record with 12. He also held the school record for most career receiving yards with 1,486.

NFL
Berra was drafted by the Baltimore Colts in the 17th round (421st overall) of the 1974 NFL Draft. He was signed by the Colts on February 10, 1974.

He played in fourteen games for the Colts in 1974, primarily on special teams. He returned 16 punts for 114 yards and 13 kickoffs for 259 yards.

The Colts released Berra on September 3, 1975.

Later life
As of May 2001, Berra resides in West Caldwell, New Jersey and is the president of LTD Enterprises, a company that handles business for his father.

References

1951 births
Living people
People from Montclair, New Jersey
People from West Caldwell, New Jersey
Players of American football from New Jersey
American football return specialists
American football wide receivers
UMass Minutemen football players
Baltimore Colts players
American people of Italian descent